Wilfred Reginald Cude (July 4, 1906 – May 5, 1968) was a Welsh-Canadian professional ice hockey player. He played ten seasons as a goaltender in the National Hockey League (NHL) for the Philadelphia Quakers, Boston Bruins, Chicago Black Hawks, Detroit Red Wings, and Montreal Canadiens.

Career
Cude was born in Barry, Wales in 1906, although his birthdate has been commonly listed as being in 1910. His father Harry Cude relocated the family to Winnipeg, Manitoba in search of employment. Wilf began playing ice hockey in Winnipeg and played for the St. Vital Saints and the Winnipeg Wellingtons in Winnipeg. Wilf was a childhood friend of Charlie Gardiner, who would also play in the National Hockey League. Wilf was a two-sport athlete. He was an outside right as a soccer player.

Cude would go on to play in the NHL from 1929–30 to 1940–41. He was signed in February 1930 by the Pittsburgh Pirates and moved with that team to Philadelphia. He was the Philadelphia Quakers' goaltender during its only disastrous 1930–31 season. In 1931–32, with the Quakers having suspended operations, Cude had the distinction of being the NHL's spare goaltender, playing for whatever team needed backup. This was a distinguished spot in the 1930s when no more than ten teams competed in any given year.

In 1933, the Quakers traded Cude to the Montreal Canadiens who already had George Hainsworth as their star goaltender. Before the 1933–34 season, Hainsworth was traded to the Toronto Maple Leafs for similarly distinguished Lorne Chabot. Cude played one game for the Canadiens before he was loaned to the Detroit Red Wings, where he posted an outstanding campaign.  He wound up leading the Red Wings to their first Stanley Cup Finals appearance, though they lost to Charlie Gardiner and the Chicago Black Hawks, falling three games to one in the best-of-five series.  Cude also surrendered the first overtime goal clinching a Stanley Cup when he was scored on by Mush March at the 10:05 mark of the second overtime in game four. He posted a league-leading 1.52 goals against average for the year.

The Canadiens were so impressed by Cude's work with the Red Wings that they traded Chabot and made Cude their number one goaltender through the 1937–38 season. He split duties with Claude Bourque in 1938–39 and ceded the starter job to Bourque in 1939–40, and to Bert Gardiner in 1940–41.

The Canadiens did not win a Stanley Cup during Cude's tenure as their starting goaltender. These were among the team's worst years, on the ice as well as in the state of their finances. The worst of these years, 1935–36, a year during which the Montreal Maroons were defending Stanley Cup champions, the Canadiens won 11, lost 26 and tied 11, though Cude posted six shutouts in those 11 victories.

The moment when Cude decided to retire from hockey is recorded in Stan Fischler's book The Zany World of Hockey. Cude was eating his afternoon steak with his wife. He threw the steak at her, missed, and it stuck to the wall. "Between the time the steak hit the wall and then hit the floor, I decided I had had enough of goaltending." Like many players, Cude was superstitious. He and his wife would drive to the rink and park the car. If Cude's team won, they would park in the same spot before the next game, until the team lost, when they would then park in a different spot.

After his playing days were over, Cude became a coach in junior hockey. He was president of the St. Laurent Intermediate League. He moved to Rouyn-Noranda, Quebec and worked for British Oil and coached junior hockey. In 1948, he became a scout for the Red Wings, and returned to coaching in 1961 as coach of the Rouyn-Noranda Alouettes. Cude died of cancer in 1968.

Awards and achievements
NHL Second All-Star Team (1936 & 1937)
"Honoured Member" of the Manitoba Hockey Hall of Fame

Career statistics

Regular season

Regular season and playoffs

See also
List of National Hockey League players from the United Kingdom

References

External links

Wilf Cude's  biography at Manitoba Hockey Hall of Fame

1906 births
1968 deaths
Boston Bruins players
Chicago Blackhawks players
Detroit Red Wings players
Montreal Canadiens players
Sportspeople from Barry, Vale of Glamorgan
Philadelphia Quakers (NHL) players
Welsh emigrants to Canada